Mian Najeebuddin Awaisi is a Pakistani politician who has been a member of the National Assembly of Pakistan, since August 2018. Previously, he was a member of the National Assembly from June 2013 to May 2018.

Political career

He served as Tehsil Nazim of Bahawalpur in 2002.

He ran for the seat of the National Assembly of Pakistan as a candidate of Pakistan Muslim League (Q) (PML-Q) from Constituency NA-184 (Bahawalpur-II) in 2008 Pakistani general election but was unsuccessful. He received 38,407 votes and lost the seat to an independent candidate, Malik Aamir Yar Waran.

He ran for the seat of the National Assembly as a candidate of Pakistan Muslim League (N) (PML-N) from Constituency NA-184 (Bahawalpur-II) in by-election held in September 2010 but was unsuccessful. He received 48,776 votes and lost the seat to Khadija Aamir Yar Malik.

He was elected to the National Assembly as a candidate of PML-N from Constituency NA-184 (Bahawalpur-II) in 2013 Pakistani general election. He received 94,429 votes and defeated Khadija Aamir Yar Malik.

In May 2016, he was appointed as Federal Parliamentary Secretary for Commerce. In October 2017, he was made parliamentary secretary for narcotics control.

He was re-elected to the National Assembly as a candidate of PML-N from Constituency NA-173 (Bahawalpur-IV) in 2018 Pakistani general election.

References

Living people
Pakistan Muslim League (N) MNAs
Pakistani MNAs 2018–2023
Pakistani MNAs 2013–2018
Year of birth missing (living people)